The following is a comprehensive discography of the Scottish pop duo Hue and Cry.

Albums

Studio albums

Live albums

Compilation albums

Singles & EPs

Video

Releases

Music videos
 "I Refuse" [Route 88 version]
 "I Refuse" [Bitter Suite version]
 "Labour of Love"
 "Strength to Strength"
 "Violently (Your Words Hit Me)"
 "Sweet Invisibility"
 "Ordinary Angel"
 "Looking for Linda"
 "She Makes a Sound"
 "Long Term Lovers of Pain"
 "Fireball"
 "The Last Stop"
 "Headin' for a Fall"
 "Duty to the Debtor"

References

Hue and Cry